Be My Baby: How I Survived Mascara, Miniskirts, and Madness, Or, My Life as a Fabulous Ronette (also published as Be My Baby: The Autobiography of Ronnie Spector) is a memoir by Ronnie Spector co-written with Vince Waldron, which recounts her roller-coaster career as lead singer of the Ronettes and her emotionally abusive marriage to Phil Spector. A film adaptation starring Zendaya as Ronnie was announced in 2021.

Publication 
The book was published on September 1, 1990 by Harmony. An updated edition titled Be My Baby: A Memoir, featuring a new postscript by Spector describing her life after 1990 and a new introduction by Keith Richards, was completed shortly before Spector's death in January 2022. The book was published by Henry Holt & Co. the following May.

Content 
Be My Baby recounts Spector's roller-coaster career as lead singer of the Ronettes and her emotionally abusive marriage to Phil Spector.

Born in Spanish Harlem, Veronica Bennett always loved to sing. As teens, she, her sister, and her cousin met an agent who introduced them to a producer, and they made a record. Soon they started performing at the Brooklyn Fox rock-and-roll revue alongside The Shirelles,  The Supremes, Marvin Gaye, and others. In 1963, Phil Spector signed them and Ronnie fell in love with him. "Be My Baby" became their first and biggest hit. The group toured England, where The Rolling Stones were their opening act and they became friends with The Beatles. Phil was fiercely possessive and became very controlling. He convinced her not to open for the Beatles. He became increasingly reclusive and violent after they married. Ronnie was imprisoned in their home and forbidden to perform. Finally, she left him and tried to relaunch her career.

Reception 
The memoir has received widely favorable reviews across several decades since its publication. In Rolling Stone in 2012, Rob Sheffield named it as one of the 25 best rock memoirs of all time, saying "her book, like her voice, is full of cocky, smart, self-aware humor." Writing of the book's sections "describ[ing]" her time with The Beatles and the Stones, both in the U.K. and stateside," at NPR in 2016 Alison Fensterstock said Be My Baby: "deliver[s] a wild, funny, intimate and detailed account of a bunch of kids navigating fame and fun; they also describe, essentially, the singer's last flush of freedom before her relationship with Phil Spector really got bad."

The autobiography is excerpted in the 2013 Routledge anthology The Rock History Reader, which describes Be My Baby as "offering a little-seen window into the complex creative processes and inordinate power relationships behind the girl group phenomenon", in contrast to frequently trivializing depictions of the genre, or otherwise focused solely on the accomplishments of "their Svengali-like male producer or the song-writing teams that provided them with their hits."

References

Music autobiographies
1990 non-fiction books
Music books
American autobiographies
Books about women
Books about musicians
Books about pop music
Collaborative non-fiction books
Harmony Books books